The 2009–10 Nemzeti Bajnokság I competition was a Hungarian domestic rugby club competition operated by the Magyar Rögbi Szövetség (MRgSz). It began on September 5, 2009 with a match between Esztergomi Vitézek and their second team at the Ferences sporttelep in Esztergom, and continued through to the final at Széktói Stadion on June 19, 2010.

Defending champions Battai Bulldogok beat hosts Kecskeméti Atlétika és Rugby Club 16-24 to retain their title.

Competition format
Matches were played over twelve rounds.

The teams

Table

Schedule and results
From the official MRgSz site. Within each weekend, matches are to be listed in the following order:
 By date.
 If matches are held on the same day, by kickoff time.
 Otherwise, in alphabetic order of home club.

Rounds 1 to 5
Round 1
 5 September, 14:00 — Esztergomi Vitézek 22 – 20 Esztergomi Vitézek II
 5 September, 16:00 — Fit World Gorillák Szeged 5 – 36 Kecskeméti Atlétika és Rugby Club
 6 September, 14:00 — Battai Bulldogok 99 – 0 Battai Bulldogok II
 10 October, 12:00 — Pécsi Indiánok 15 – 62 Budapest Exiles
 20 March, 14:00 — Elefántok 23 – 39 Spartan Oradea

Round 2
 12 September, 14:00 — Fit World Gorillák Szeged 50 – 32 Esztergomi Vitézek II
 12 September, 14:00 — Kecskeméti Atlétika és Rugby Club 9 – 29 Battai Bulldogok
 12 September, 14:00 — Spartan Oradea 17 – 22 Esztergomi Vitézek
 12 September, 16:00 — Pécsi Indiánok 5 – 26 Elefántok

Round 3
 19 September, 14:00 — Budapest Exiles 26 – 22 Esztergomi Vitézek
 20 September, 14:00 — Esztergomi Vitézek II 0 – 26 Elefántok
 27 September, 14:00 — Spartan Oradea 22 – 55 Battai Bulldogok
 14 November, 14:00 — Battai Bulldogok II 54 – 21 Fit World Gorillák Szeged

Round 4
 3 October, 12:00 — Esztergomi Vitézek II 12 – 33 Battai Bulldogok II
 3 October, 13:15 — Fit World Gorillák Szeged 41 – 27 Pécsi Indiánok
 3 October, 14:00 — Budapest Exiles 71 – 5 Spartan Oradea
 14 November, 14:00 — Esztergomi Vitézek 6 – 3 Kecskeméti Atlétika és Rugby Club

Round 5
 25 October, 14:00 — Elefántok 5 – 22 Battai Bulldogok II
 25 October, 14:00 — Kecskeméti Atlétika és Rugby Club 35 – 3 Spartan Oradea
 25 October, 14:00 — Pécsi Indiánok 35 – 22 Esztergomi Vitézek II
 8 November, 13:00 — Battai Bulldogok 24 – 5 Budapest Exiles

Rounds 6 to 10
Round 6
 7 November, 12:00 — Battai Bulldogok II 36 – 14 Pécsi Indiánok
 7 November, 14:00 — Fit World Gorillák Szeged 26 – 19 Elefántok
 28 November, 13:15 — Budapest Exiles 0 – 17 Kecskeméti Atlétika és Rugby Club
 12 December, 15:00 — Esztergomi Vitézek 6 – 13 Battai Bulldogok

Round 7
 25 April, 14:00 — Budapest Exiles 51 – 15 Elefántok
 25 April, 14:00 — Kecskeméti Atlétika és Rugby Club 26 – 10 Esztergomi Vitézek II
 1 May, 14:00 — Spartan Oradea 45 – 7 Battai Bulldogok II
 11 May, 18:00 — Battai Bulldogok 128 - 0 Pécsi Indiánok
 25 May, 18:00 — Esztergomi Vitézek 26 – 0 Fit World Gorillák Szeged

Round 8
 13 March, 14:00 — Kecskeméti Atlétika és Rugby Club 52 – 14 Budapest Exiles
 28 March, 15:00 — Battai Bulldogok 17 – 16 Esztergomi Vitézek
 10 April, 14:15 — Elefántok 18 – 35 Fit World Gorillák Szeged
 25 April, 14:00 — Pécsi Indiánok 40 – 23 Battai Bulldogok II

Round 9
 6 March, 14:00 — Budapest Exiles 5 – 62 Battai Bulldogok
 27 March, 14:00 — Spartan Oradea 12 – 38 Kecskeméti Atlétika és Rugby Club
 25 May, 18:30 — Battai Bulldogok II 41 – 10 Elefántok

Round 10
 27 March, 14:00 — Fit World Gorillák Szeged 0 – 22 Battai Bulldogok II
 4 May, 18:30 — Elefántok 7 – 37 Esztergomi Vitézek II
 9 May, 15:00 — Esztergomi Vitézek 39 – 7 Budapest Exiles
 22 May, 17:00 — Battai Bulldogok 52 – 3 Spartan Oradea

Rounds 11 and 12
Round 11
 20 March, 13:15 — Esztergomi Vitézek II 38 – 14 Pécsi Indiánok
 3 April, 11:00 — Kecskeméti Atlétika és Rugby Club 6 – 3 Esztergomi Vitézek
 17 April, 14:00 — Pécsi Indiánok 17 – 29 Fit World Gorillák Szeged
 17 April, 14:00 — Spartan Oradea 22 – 12 Budapest Exiles
 22 May, 15:00 — Battai Bulldogok II 13 – 22 Esztergomi Vitézek II

Round 12
 20 March, 14:00 — Battai Bulldogok 12 – 16 Kecskeméti Atlétika és Rugby Club
 10 April, 14:00 — Esztergomi Vitézek 58 – 0 Spartan Oradea
 8 May, 13:00 — Esztergomi Vitézek II 31 – 10 Fit World Gorillák Szeged
 8 May, 16:00 — Elefántok 31 – 12 Pécsi Indiánok

Playoffs

Quarter-finals

Semi-finals

Third place playoff

Final

References

Nemzeti Bajnoksag I (rugby union)
Rugby union leagues in Hungary
2009 in Hungarian sport
2010 in Hungarian sport